The 1992 season is the 6th season of the league that began on December 27, 1991, and concluded with the championship game on April 11, 1992.

Team movement
1992 saw the debut of the Buffalo Bandits, and also saw the New England Blazers move to Boston.

Regular season

All Star Game
No All-Star Game was played in 1992.

Playoffs

* indicates an overtime period

Awards

All-Pro Teams
First Team:
Gary Gait, Detroit
Paul Gait, Detroit
Dave Pietramala, Pittsburgh
Rick Sowell, Baltimore
John Tucker, Philadelphia
Sal LoCascio, New York (goalie)

Second Team:
Jeff Jackson, Baltimore
Derek Keenan, Buffalo
Darris Kilgour, Buffalo
John Nostrant, Philadelphia
Jim Veltman, Buffalo
Dallas Eliuk, Philadelphia (goalie)

Statistics leaders
Bold numbers indicate new single-season records. Italics indicate tied single-season records.

See also
 1992 in sports

References
1992 Archive at the Outsider's Guide to the NLL

Mill
Major Indoor Lacrosse League seasons